In set theory, 
Cichoń's diagram  or Cichon's diagram is a table of 10 infinite cardinal numbers related to the set theory of the reals displaying the provable relations between these 
cardinal characteristics of the continuum. Four cardinals describe properties of the ideal of sets of measure zero; four more describe the corresponding properties of the ideal of meager sets (first category sets).

Definitions

Let I be an ideal of a fixed infinite set X, containing all finite subsets of X. We define the following "cardinal coefficients" of I:

The "additivity" of I is the smallest number of sets from I whose union is not in I any more.   As any ideal is closed under finite unions, this number is always at least ; if I is a σ-ideal, then add(I) ≥ .

 The "covering number" of I is the smallest number of sets from I whose union is all of X.  As X itself is not in I, we must have add(I) ≤ cov(I).

 The "uniformity number" of I (sometimes also written ) is the size of the smallest set not in I.  By our assumption on I, add(I) ≤ non(I).

 The "cofinality" of I is the cofinality of the partial order (I, ⊆). It is easy to see that we must have non(I) ≤ cof(I) and cov(I) ≤ cof(I).

Furthermore, the "bounding number" or "unboundedness number"  and the "dominating number"  are defined as follows:

where  "" means: "there are infinitely many natural numbers n such that …", and "" means "for all except finitely many natural numbers n we have …".

Diagram
Let  be the  σ-ideal of those subsets of the real line that are meager (or "of the first category") in the euclidean topology, and let 
 be the σ-ideal of those subsets of the real line that are of Lebesgue measure zero. Then the following inequalities hold:

In addition, the following relations  hold: 

It turns out that the inequalities described by the diagram, together with the relations mentioned above, are all the relations between these cardinals that are provable in ZFC, in the following limited sense. Then if A is consistent with the diagram's relations, and if A also satisfies the two additional relations, then A can be realized in some model of ZFC.

For larger continuum sizes, the situation is less clear.

Some inequalities in the diagram (such as "add ≤ cov") follow immediately from the definitions.  The inequalities  and 
 are classical theorems 
and follow from the fact that the real line can be partitioned into a meager set and a set of measure zero.

Remarks

The British mathematician David Fremlin named the diagram after  the Polish mathematician from Wrocław, .

References 

Cardinal numbers
Descriptive set theory